Dorio is a comune (municipality) in the Province of Lecco in the Italian region Lombardy, located on the upper eastern shore of Lake of Como, about  north of Milan and about  north of Lecco.

Dorio borders the following municipalities: Colico, Dervio, Introzzo, Pianello del Lario, Sueglio, Tremenico, Vestreno.

References

External links

 Official website

Cities and towns in Lombardy